is an anime series loosely based on the American comic book of the same name. Not an adaptation of the original story, the series has a new setting and characters. However, the anime version is considered controversial by some fans because GONZO has announced that the main character of the anime is of Japanese ethnicity but is not Itagaki, Shiori, or Yuka, one of the previous bearers of the Witchblade. Instead, it is a new character named Masane. Although this series sets up an entirely new story with all new characters, it is set in the same continuity as the comic book.

Story

The lead character (and blade wielder) is Masane Amaha, a kindhearted, well-intentioned woman who is clumsy and awkward around the house. Having lost her memory during the Great Quake which ravaged Tokyo, Masane was found uninjured at the quake's ground zero with a baby in her arms. Six years later she returns to Tokyo with the child (whom she believes is her daughter), intending to live a peaceful life. Masane becomes entangled in a power struggle between a large corporation and a government agency, and discovers that a mysterious bracelet on her right wrist is the legendary Witchblade.

Characters

Main characters

Masane is the main protagonist of the series and the bearer of the Witchblade. She became the Witchblade's bearer six years before the beginning of the series during an event that destroyed most of Tokyo, leaving her with amnesia and holding a baby girl. Masane is also an unemployed single mother, and is at odds with the NSWF's Child Welfare Division over issues concerning the custody of her adoptive daughter, Rihoko. When the Witchblade activates, her eyes turn demonically black and she dons a skimpy black armor with katana blades and claws extending from her arms and her hair, which was normally brown, but crimson upon transformation, can extend to tendrils that can lash or pierce her enemies. She also gains enhanced strength, speed, and endurance. She also gains a type of telepathic link to Rihoko, being able to sense when she is in danger. After unlocking new power in the Witchblade, her armor becomes red and she has a blade on both arms. When fighting, she is possessed by an almost uncontrollable desire for destruction, deriving an erotic like pleasure from battle.

Rihoko is Masane Amaha's adoptive daughter. Her biological mother is Reina Soho, and her biological father is Reiji Takayama. She was found as a newborn with an amnesiac young woman, who authorities believed to be her mother from a maternity diary found with them, at the epicenter of the Great Quake. Rihoko is apparently more compatible with the Witchblade than anyone else, and it was she who was responsible for Reina's initial high compatibility rating, because Reina was pregnant with Rihoko at the time. Rihoko is frequently praised for her good cooking capabilities. She is very mature for her age and is often noted for being more capable than Masane.

Yusuke Tozawa is a freelance photographer seeking information about the Witchblade for a story, since he believes that it is associated with certain serial killings. He eventually becomes Masane's friend. He is among the first ones to nickname Masane "Masamune" ("Melony" in the English dub), referring to her huge chest ("masa-mune" meaning "undefeatable breasts", and "Melony" referring to her breasts as melons). This is carried over in the anime, to the point that Tozawa only refers to Masane with this nickname.

Reiji Takayama is the Bureau Chief of Douji Group Industries and the biological father of Rihoko. He also is the one responsible for employing Masane to fight-off malfunctioning "Ex-cons", highly technological weapons developed by his own employers. Takayama is a stoic and very stern man who shows little to no expressions at all. He is usually accompanied by his assistant, Hiroki Segawa. Takayama seems to have a past relationship with Reina Soho, possibly a sexual one, as it is briefly discussed between himself, a point which he says is possible, which he later affirmed completely in Episode 19. They both had worked together before the ground-zero event in doing research on the Witchblade. Initially Takayama appears to be cynical and cold, but as the anime progresses this proves to be completely false as his relationship with Masane deepens. He and Masane later become romantically involved in episode 19. Masane later attempts to get him and Riko closer after learning he is her real father. He is last seen standing with Riko at the site of Masane's last fight, watching on as she sacrifices her life.

The most powerful of the First Generation Cloneblades and the biological mother of Rihoko. Reina Soho is a Neogene who works as a Forensics Medicine Specialist in the National Scientific Welfare Foundation (NSWF). She is a strong and intelligent woman. Nevertheless, she is quite self-centered. Unlike most of her First-Generation counterparts, Reina has come to terms with the fact that Furumizu views her and the rest of her Neogene sisters as nothing more than tools at his disposal. By the same token, however, she feels no obligation to answer to his every beck and call. Her nickname as a Cloneblade is "Lady". In her youth, she was found to be a potential bearer for the "true" Witchblade. Eager to test the limits of her genetic potential, Reina and her assistant, Shiori Tsuzuki, attempted to forcibly remove the Witchblade from Masane. It turns out that Reina's high compatibility with the Witchblade was due to the fact that she was carrying Rihoko at the time, and after giving birth, her compatibility dropped significantly. Of all the Cloneblades, Reina was regarded as the most advanced of her Neogene sisters. As a Cloneblade, Reina bore a huge blade on her left forearm, and had wing-like appendages that could transform into robust shields from blades. Reina considered herself and everyone around her as objects to be researched. She even went so far as to seize custody of Rihoko, in order to test how motherhood would affect her mentally. Much to her surprise, she began to develop maternal feelings for the girl. The full extent of her love for Rihoko is revealed when she sacrifices herself to protect her from the psychopathic Neogene, Maria. Her cloneblade armor is white and pink.

Antagonists

The leader of the NSWF and the main antagonist for most of the series. He is known as "Father" by his Neogene "daughters" and the orphans in his care. Despite being a brilliant scholar and successful bureaucrat in his prime, Furimizu has all but withdrawn from public life by the story's present in his obsessive pursuit of the Witchblade. Despite exuberating charm and paternal warmth when interacting with the public and his "children", he is, in reality, an utterly ruthless, cowardly narcissist, who has no concern for the physical and emotional well-being of those who serve him. Later in the series, he is revealed to be unable to have children. Believing his father to be perfect in every way, Furumizu comes to the conclusion that his mother's genes are to blame for his malady. He attempts to create the perfect mother from his own "superior" genes which results in the creation of several genetically enhanced women known as Neogenes. After selecting a candidate for the Witchblade among the Neogenes, Furumizu hopes to be reborn from the loins of the designated bearer as a superior being. Following the capture and study of Masane Amaha, he arrogantly believes that he could make a cloneblade more powerful than the original. After realizing that her "grandfather" views her as nothing more than a tool for his rebirth, a radically powerful Neogene named Maria mortally wounds Furumizu in a coup. As Furumizu chokes on his own blood, Nishida informs him that she purposefully neglected to incorporate his genes into the newest batch of Neogene zygotes, as they could not achieve anything more from the continued use of his "flawed" genes. With his life's ambitions ruined beyond repair, Furumizu succumbs to a nervous breakdown. He wails hysterically over the loss of his "mother" and begins frantically ingesting the genetic material for the next generation of sisters. Disgusted by his unsightly behavior, Maria finishes him off with one last blow.

An extremely powerful Second-Generation Cloneblade and a major antagonist. As the strongest of the Second generation "sisters" engineered by the NSWF, she is the first to be equipped with a Dual Cloneblade. Her cloneblade armor is purple and red. She appears much older than she truly is which suggests that the sisters age rapidly. Maria undergoes many changes throughout the series. She starts out as a hyper, mentally unstable adolescent with an extreme inferiority complex. While extremely strong and dangerous, she is little more than an insecure child desperate for attention and a mother to call her own. This changes when her actual mother, Reina, rejects her. After killing Reina in a rage, her personality becomes almost catatonic. She also changes her appearance to match the deceased Reina's. After hearing of Furumizu's plans to use her as a surrogate mother for his "perfect" clone, her disgust transforms her into a ruthless megalomaniac who seeks power at all costs. She kills Furumizu and seizes control of the NSWF. She pledges to transform the NSWF into an army that will secure power for herself as well as the Neogene "chosen ones". After sensing the immense power coming from the original Witchblade, she becomes determined to take it for herself. In truth, however, Maria is the leader of the organization in name only. With no clear goal other than to obtain power at all costs, Maria becomes even more secretive and reclusive than her late "father". With the exception of Aoi, cloneblades such as Asagi view her as an insecure child trying to "act tough". As Maria drifts aimlessly, Nishida effectively runs the entire organization and continues to use its resources to hunt for the Witchblade. Her Cloneblade form is not quite as heavily armored as the others. Nevertheless, it is by far the strongest. In her cloneblade form she is able to extend her fingers and impale her victims multiple times. The extent of her power can be seen when she pierces Reina's armor blades with ease. In the end, Maria meets her demise while fantasizing despairingly about her mother. In her final moments, she asks the hallucination of her mother if "she still loved her". Maria barely has the chance to finish her sentence as she turns to crystal dust.

Nora is a Neogene who serves as Tatsuoki Furumizu's assistant. She is one of Furimuzu's most loyal and reliable subordinates. Coolly arrogant and blunt in her interactions with others, she is very competitive with her sisters and is prone to jealousy. After watching Furimuzu reward Maria's tantrum with a trip to the toy store, Nora roughly manhandles her and confines her to a hotel room after the mentally unstable Neogene loses her temper in public. With the exception of Furumizu himself, she considers everyone and everything around her as a tool for her advancement. She is also a very powerful cloneblade. Unlike Masane and Shiori, she is able to effectively control her carnal impulses while transformed' much like Reina. Her nickname as a cloneblade is "Spider", she has the ability to shoot needles and entrap her opponents with strands from her hair and three rapier like blades on her left arm. She battled Masane and was able to capture her to have the Witchblade removed from her. She later is assigned by Nishida to obtain Rihoko for experimentation, but is stopped by Reina, the child's biological mother. Seeing this as an opportunity to finally have it out with her biggest rival, she takes on Reina, whom ultimately proves to be the better of the two after using the shield blades on her hair to impale and kill Nora. Her cloneblade armor is orange and green.

Aoi is the first sparring partner that Maria does not injure. They become good friends to the point of Aoi becoming her assistant and best friend later on in the anime, where she too is equipped with a Dual Cloneblade. As a Cloneblade she is melee fighter using fan like blades. She has small blue eyes and blond hair she wears in braids. She wears an orange dress. It is worth noting that Aoi is fanatically loyal to Maria, to the point of attacking Masane in a blind rage, for injuring Maria, later in the series. This proves to be fatal, as she is impaled and killed by Masane. Her last words were for Maria to continue her quest to obtain the Witchblade. It is also worth noting that Aoi is the only person Maria seems to care about, being her only friend, to the point of crying over her death. Her cloneblade armor is blue and orange.

Asagi is the sister chosen by Aoi when Maria asked her to choose a capable sister to help herself and Aoi fight and take the Witchblade from Masane. She also is equipped with the Dual Cloneblade. She acts calmly but without any interest in her role, a behavior reflected in her physical appearance as well, often questioning for what or who Maria is acting, and what she really wants, which often earns a scolding from Aoi. For this very reason, Maria kills her, impaling her. Asagi is the only Cloneblade in the entire anime that doesn't fight (she does fight some exCons, but this isn't shown). Her cloneblade armor is black and blue.

Shiori acts as the secretary and assistant of Reina. She is a lesbian and is sexually infatuated with her employer (though this is mostly cut off in the censored version aired in Japan), whom she affectionately addresses as "Sensei" (Or Doctor in the English dub). She's also a Cloneblade. She is the very first one to fight against Masane. Nicknamed "Diva", she acts arrogant and confident, but is soon revealed to have little to no control over her impulses as a Cloneblade. While in her Cloneblade form she sports a large scythe-like blade, and later gains one on both arms. She brutally beats Masane and chases her relentlessly only to be stopped by Reina herself. During her fight with Masane her Cloneblade is critically damaged. As a result, her impulses and emotion become enslaved by the carnal drive of her cloneblade. She quickly becomes a psychotic maniac, slaughtering, seeking fight and even raping for pure pleasure. In the end, she succeeds in unlocking the full powers of the Cloneblade albeit for a short moment. After attacking and beating Masane, she attempts to rape Takayama. However, her body crumbles into crystal dust before she is able to rape her beloved sensei's lover. Her cloneblade armor is blue and cyan, but turns to blue and red after unlocking her full power.

Dr. Rie Nishida is the amoral chief researcher of the NSWF. After Furumizu's death, she and Wado become the story's main antagonists. Nishida is extremely obsessed with researching the capabilities of the Witchblade and cared little for any laws and restrictions that would be placed on her experiments. She has monitored and helped to create several generations of Neogenes at NSWF's secret facilities. Nishida was in charge of creating the fourth generation of Neogene sisters who were going to have Maria's genes as the ultimate mother. She switched her allegiance to Maria because she saw Furumizu as a fool for ignoring the many possibilities for the Witchblade and Neogenes in front of him in favor of his own pitiful desire. After Furumizu's death, Nishida is effectively in charge of the NSWF since Maria cared little for the day-to-day management of the corporation. With her new executive powers at NSWF, Nishida continues her secret alliance with Wado, who by this time is the new Bureau Chief of the Douji Group. After Masane stays with Takayama after his resignation from Douji, Nishida aids Wado in their attempts to claim the Witchblade for themselves. Nishida becomes increasingly fascinated with the Witchblade's full potential, seeing the chance to more fully understand a power close to God. During the iWeapon incident in Tokyo, Nishida becomes obsessed with the cataclysmic energy readings resulting from the conflict and drives closer to the violence in order to get a better examination. Heedless of the risk to her life, she fails to notice an incoming iWeapon that crushes her car and herself and the car explodes.

Masaya Wado is the Director of the Bio Division at Douji Group Industries. After Furumizu's death, he and Nishida become the story's main antagonists. He has known and competed with Takayama since college, where they were once members of a rowing team. At Douji, Wado constantly sought to outdo and eventually oust Takayama. When the Witchblade, worn by Masane, eventually returns to Douji, Wado's jealousy of Takayama grows and he secretly conducts his own experiments to create a weapon to rival the Witchblade, eventually conceiving the Ultimateblade. During this time, Wado secretly meets with Dr. Nishida of the NSWF in order to gain access to their own research on the Witchblade as well as Nishida's support with his agenda. Arrogant, psychotic, and ambitious, yet petty, cowardly and obsessive, Wado often pursues his goals while neglecting the consequences of his actions until it was too late. This is first demonstrated when he attempted to frame Takayama for the murderous rampages of the Ultimateblade. In doing so, he endangered Douji as a whole with a potential public scandal that was avoided only when Takayama voluntarily stepped down as Bureau Chief. In an incident that finally destroyed the Douji Group, Wado made several attempts to reclaim the Witchblade for his own, thus encouraging its growth in power. With this, Douji's  began to malfunction, yet Wado ignored the potential dangers. When hundreds of  malfunctioned and escaped a cargo ship to converge on Tokyo with the goal of destroying the Witchblade, Wado finally realizes the magnitude of his actions. Takayama declares that it would be impossible since there were too many lives at stake and that Wado had no one to blame but himself. The last time Wado is seen, he has apparently gone insane from the enormity of his loss with reporters approaching from behind him. What happened to him after that is unknown.

Yagi is the meek assistant of Masaya Wado. Following Wado's failure to outdo Takayama with the Ultimateblade, his employer forces him to wear an Ultimateblade in a psychotic attempt to assassinate Takayama. However, he goes mad and is driven to homicidal, murderous rages, barely held in check by Wado's team of scientists. While on the verge of a complete blade induced breakdown, Wado takes advantage of his diminished sanity and sends him to kill Takayama, with the false promise of helping him. He attacks Takayama at his home, but Masane is there with him and engages him. While he initially had the upper hand on her, Masane unlocks a new transformation of the Witchblade and ultimately kills him. His ultimate blade form is sage with red marks.

Minor characters

Segawa Hiroki is Reiji Takayama's assistant and right hand man. He is always prepared and is a very capable assistant. He is the kind of person who loves power and his loyalty lies with who ever is stronger. He describes himself as a person who loves to follow those who have power, and demonstrates it by switching sides with whoever wields the most powerful position within Dohji Industries. He is last seen standing with the Dohji recovery team on a bridge wishing Takayama good luck.

Owner of the Natsuki Building where Masane and Rihoko live. She is also the proprietress of the Marry's Gallery bar on the first floor. She is brash and sharp tongued, but is a kindhearted person who has a soft spot for Rihoko.

A wacky old man, who is a Natsuki Building fixture. A master of IT related matters, he is famous in the world of hackers. He is quite perverted, often known for trying to peek in the woman's baths, but is really a good person who looks out for Rihoko.

A fortune teller who sets up shop in the Natsuki Building, but her extreme shyness around strangers and her sensitivity hurts her business. She is often the object of Mr. Cho's teasing.

A towering figure, taller than most of the other characters, who lives in the top floor of the Natsuki Building. He hardly ever says a word, but is apparently famous in some circles, though it is unknown what for.

An agent of the NSWF's child welfare group, she attempted to remove Rihoko from Masane's care due to their lack of a home and employment.

A detective in the Tokyo Police Department in charge of the investigation of mysterious deaths of NSWF personnel, unaware that the perpetrators are X-Cons. He often crosses paths with Tozawa, who constantly agitates him. He also personally knew the human identity of one of the X-Cons prior to his death.

Terminology
The Witchblade
An autonomous, partially sentient artifact of unimaginable dark magical power that takes the form of a gray bracelet with a blood red eye in its center. Many wars have been fought by those who sought to control it. Few seem to realize or care that the Witchblade itself is a sentient being with its own mysterious desires. Six years before the story begins, the artifact wound up in the possession of the Douji Group who sought to use the item to benefit themselves. It was taken from them by Reina Soho, a member of the NSWF. She took the blade and rather than turn it over to the NSWF, ran into hiding. During an attempt by the NSWF and Douji Group to take it from her, the blade released a massive surge of power and triggered what was later known as the "Great Quake". For some reason it then chose a young woman named Masane Amaha to become its bearer. It was eventually deduced that the Witchblade would ultimately choose Masane's adopted daughter, Rihoko, as its bearer once she was mature enough. The Witchblade was only usable by Reina and Masane due to their proximity to Rihoko, whom the weapon chose as its true bearer even before her birth. Once she realized this, Masane vowed to save her daughter from the Witchblade's cursed destiny. The Witchblade chooses only a woman to be its bearer, becoming a silver bracelet with a red jewel. When the blade activates, it covers the bearer with a revealing, organic looking armor and grants enhanced physical abilities and the ability to sprout raze-sharp blades from their body that can slice through almost anything, even flesh. It also turns the wearers blood white while transformed. Though the abilities it grants are great, it becomes a double-edged sword that gradually breaks down the bearer's body eventually killing them.

The Cloneblade
Before the Great Quake, the NSWF studied the Witchblade and used their research to create a biological copy of it, dubbed the Cloneblade. The Cloneblades possess many of the same powers as the Witchblade but are cheap imitations of the original. Known Cloneblade wielders include Reina Soho, Shiori Tsuzuki, and Nora. A human equipped with a Cloneblade wears a silver bracelet with a blue jewel on their left wrist. When activated, the wearer gains a metallic armor with glowing lines, and usually a large blade. Later research led to the creation of much stronger Dual Cloneblades: two Cloneblades being wielded at once by the same person. Known Dual Cloneblade wielder include Maria, Aoi, and Asagi. A human equipped with a Dual Cloneblade wears ornate silver bracelets with purple jewels on both wrists. As they are copies of the original Witchblade, they pose the same risks to the wielder, namely the breaking down of their bodies which can lead to death. Should a wielder die in their transformed state, either succumbing to the blade induced breakdown or being killed by an opponent, their bodies turn into transparent crystal that then crumbles to dust, leaving the Cloneblade intact.

X-cons
X-Cons were mechanical monsters manufactured by the Douji Group that Masane fought during the first half of the series. During the cataclysm known as "the Great Quake", they were all released and have been wandering around ever since. They were camouflaged in human form, but when they sensed power emanating from the Witchblade or a Cloneblade, they reveal their real forms. Similar to the Witchblade and Cloneblades, the X-Cons lust for combat. Almost no two are alike and each possess a different method of fighting. It is later revealed that the Ex-cons were created using corpses that were signed over to Douji. All X-Cons shown have taken the form of men and possess a black Witchblade-like bracelet on their forearm. The different types are:
 Hammer Man: The first X-Con introduced, it took the form of a man in lockup. Its transformed state moves around on spherical leg parts, anchors itself with its arms, then pulverizes its victims with the large crusher equipped on its front. It was responsible for several murders of NSWF personnel. It attacked Masane in jail, but was quickly destroyed after she transformed for the first time. 
 Microwave Man: An X-Con with the appearance of an obese man. When transformed, it captures people with a claw and pulls them in to use three vacuum tube-like protuberances to heat them up like a microwave oven. Classified as a type EM, this was a mass produced model. The first was destroyed by Masane while the last three were destroyed by Reina and Shiori. 
 Trap Man: A Spider-like X-Con who uses a freezing membrane to capture its victims then crunches them to pieces. After slaughtering a bus full of people it was destroyed by Masane. 
 Mosquito Man: In life, this X-Con was a police officer whose desire to protect a radio personality bordered on obsession, so he was fired and committed suicide. As an X-Con, he uses needles on his arms to drain his victims of their blood after trying to make them say the phrase the radio personality was famous for. Unlike others of its kind, it still possessed its human personality but couldn't control its murderous impulses. It was finally put out of its misery by Masane after begging to die.
 Barricade Man: One of four X-Cons that was drawn to the immense power coming from a psychoticaly enraged Maria. Shaped like a barricade, it was destroyed by Masane after threatening Rihoko. 
 Propeller Man: One of four X-Cons that was drawn to the immense power coming from a psychoticaly enraged Maria. Capable of flight, it was destroyed by Masane after threatening Rihoko. 
 Flame Man: One of four X-Cons that was drawn to the immense power coming from a psychoticaly enraged Maria. Structured like a flamethrower, it spews fire. It was destroyed by Masane after threatening Rihoko. 
 Drill Man: One of four X-Cons that was drawn to the immense power coming from a psychoticaly enraged Maria. An ant-like X-Con with a large drill on its back. It was destroyed by Masane after threatening Rihoko.

Neogenes
Neogenes are humans created through genetic manipulation and genetically predisposed to wield Cloneblades and were given the name "Cloneblade Sisters". Once they completed training the Neogenes were equipped with a Cloneblade; all had personalized armor and wielded either an extendable weapon or a unique blade. It is later revealed that the Neogenes were created using the genetics of Tatsuoki Furumizu and either a superior female specimen or a previous generation Neogene. Neogenes that are born in the same generation call themselves 'sisters'. Several of the first generation sisters are mothers of the second; Reina, for example is Maria's mother. They were created for the sole purpose of giving Furumizu the "perfect mother" so he could be reborn as a perfected human. While Furumizu treats them as his own daughters, he actually holds no real love for them and only sees them as tools for his own ultimate ambition.

 are the second generation of weapons created by the Douji Group. They resemble tanks and have an array of missiles and a mounted cannon. Unlike their predecessors, the Ex-cons, they respond to human control and have built in safeguards to prevent them from going berserk when sensing the Witchblade; however, the safeguards failed after the Witchblade transformed.

Ultimate Blade
In an attempt to upstage Takayama, Wado, leader of Douji Group, secretly develops what he called an Ultimate Blade, which can be wielded by a man. The Ultimate Blade is an experimental bio-weapon developed by the Douji Group Bio Division under the name "Project Witchblade". The only known Ultimate Blade wielder is Wado's assistant Yagi. Though it proves to be almost more powerful than the original, it causes accelerated breakdown and kills the wielder more quickly than the Witchblade. In addition to two, bladed gauntlets and full-body high-density armor, the Ultimate Blade is also equipped with a high-powered machine gun. The project is largely a personal project of Wado's, who hopes that sales for the Ultimate Blade exceed those of the  produced by Takayama's division. After failing to impress the Douji Group's board of directors with the Ultimate Blade project, Wado callously uses his own meek assistant, Yagi, as a test subject for the Ultimate Blade, in a desperate attempt to demonstrate the weapon's power. As a result Yagi goes mad and is driven to homicidal, murderous rages, barely held in check by Wado's team of scientists. After Takayama steps down as Bureau Chief, Wado grows fearful of Takayama's possible return to Douji and sends Ultimate Blade Yagi to kill Takayama at his home. Fortunately Masane is with Takayama at the time and protects Takayama. In combat the Ultimate Blade exceeds the Witchblade's power at first. However, Masane unlocks the Witchblade's full capabilities and quickly dispatches the Ultimate Blade. The failure of the Ultimate Blade project and the demonstration of the Witchblade's full power drive Wado over the edge, eventually leading to the ruin of the Douji Group.

Anime
The anime was produced by Gonzo and directed by Yoshimitsu Ohashi aired in Japan from April 16 to September 20, 2006, on TBS. From episodes 1-13 and 24, the first opening theme is "XTC", by Psychic Lover. From episodes 14–23, the second opening theme is "Dear Bob", by Koologi. From episodes 1–12, the first ending theme is "Ashita no Te" (あしたの手), by Mamiko Noto. From episodes 13–23, the second ending theme is "Kutsuhimo" (靴ひも), by Asami Yamamoto. From episodes 24, third ending theme is "Kodō -get closer-" (鼓動 -get closer-), by Psychic Lover. From the epilogue, the fourth theme is "get the fuck off" (鼓動 -yakuza-), by Psychic Lover.

Witchblade was licensed for release in the United States, and the dubbed English-language version premiered on the US cable network IFC on September 21, 2007. The show appeared on Tuesdays and Wednesdays at 3:30 AM ET, and the series finale aired on June 13, 2008.

The series was released on DVD in the US and Canada in six volumes in December 2008. A Blu-ray box set was released on November 3, 2009.

It was available as a paid download on Xbox Live and PlayStation Network. The first twelve episodes are available for download on Amazon's Unbox service. As of June 2011, it was available free of charge on Hulu.

Crew
Planning: Arthur Smith (GDH), Kenji Shimizu (Sky Perfect Well Think), Naotsugu Katō (CBC), Taitō Okiura (Gonzo)
Executive producer: Koji Kajita
Executive producer: Marc Silvestri
Original story: Top Cow Productions
Series composition: Yasuko Kobayashi
Character design: Makoto Uno
Conceptual design & setting research: Shinya Ogura
Design works: Kazuyuki Matsubara
Art director: Junichi Higashi
Color design: Yūko Satō
Editing: Kiyoshi Hirose
Music: Masanori Takumi
Sound direction: Jin Aketagawa
Sound effects: Katsuhiro Nakano (Soundbox), Naoto Yamatani (Soundbox)
Producers: Masaru Nagai (GDH), Susumu Hieda (SKY Perfect Well Think), Takeyuki Okazaki (CBC)
Director: Yoshimitsu Ohashi
Animation production: Gonzo
Production: Chubu-Nippon Broadcasting (CBC), SKY Perfect Well Think, GDH

Notes

References

Further reading

External links

FUNimation's Witchblade website
Reviews of the Funimation DVD releases (link not working)

Witchblade
Japanese adult animated superhero television series
Anime based on comics
Funimation
Gonzo (company)
Superheroes in anime and manga
Television series by Sony Pictures Television
Television shows based on Top Cow Productions
Television series based on Image Comics